Events in the year 1958 in Norway.

Incumbents
 Monarch – Olav V
 Prime Minister – Einar Gerhardsen (Labour Party)

Events

 8 January – Fire breaks out in the coastal steamer MS Erling Jarl while it is docked in Bodø. 14 people are killed.
 22 June – Olav V is crowned as ruler of Norway in the Nidaros Cathedral.

Popular culture

Sports

Music

Film

Literature
Harald Sverdrup, poet and children's writer, is awarded the Norwegian Critics Prize for Literature for his poetry, Sankt Elms ild.
Astrid Tollefsen, poet, is awarded the Gyldendal's Endowment literature prize.

Notable births

 

28 January – Lisbeth Bodd, performance artist and theatre leader (died 2014).
4 February – Kjell Ola Dahl, writer
25 February – Eugene Ejike Obiora, died during police arrest (died 2006)
19 May – Sjur Loen, curler.
9 June – Inghill Johansen, writer.
19 June – Siri Bjerke, politician
28 July – Peter M. Haugan, scientist and Director of the Geophysical Institute, University of Bergen
16 August – Steve Sem-Sandberg, journalist, novelist, and non-fiction writer.
26 August – Nils Carl Aspenberg, historian, author and businessperson
24 September – Kim Haugen, actor.
7 October – Siv Nordrum, journalist and politician (died 2021).
23 October – Liv Signe Navarsete, politician and Minister
30 October – Gunn Marit Helgesen, politician
23 November – Kjerstin Andersen, handball player.
24 November – Randi Hansen, pop singer
26 November – Rune Gokstad, comedian, actor, and radio and television host.
15 December – Christopher Hjort, typographer and graphical designer
29 December – Karin Singstad, handball player and Olympic medalist.

Notable deaths

21 January – Sven Nielsen, politician (born 1883)
29 January – Arnfinn Heje, sailor and Olympic gold medallist (born 1887)
29 January – Birger Øivind Meidell, politician (born 1882)
9 February – Lars Osa, artist (born 1860)
22 February – Thorleif Petersen, gymnast and Olympic gold medallist (born 1884)
25 February – Ole Sørensen, sailor and Olympic gold medallist (born 1883)
18 March – Sigve Lie, sailor and twice Olympic gold medallist (born 1906)
19 March – Helmer Hermandsen, rifle shooter and Olympic silver medallist (born 1871)
19 April – Andreas Strand, gymnast and Olympic silver medallist (born 1889)
20 June – Ingvald Haugen, trade unionist and politician (born 1894)
27 June – Ragna Wettergreen, stage and film actress (born 1864)
16 July – Birger Eriksen, military officer (born 1875)
18 August – Mikkel Sveinhaug, farmer and politician (born 1873)
2 September – Paul Tjøstolsen Sunde, politician (born 1896)
11 September – Dorthea Dahl, writer in America (born 1881)
16 September – Olav Berntsen Oksvik, politician and Minister (born 1887)
18 September – Olaf Gulbransson, artist, painter and designer (born 1873)
5 October – Nils Bertelsen, sailor and Olympic gold medallist (born 1879)
5 November – Gunnar Larsen, journalist, writer and translator (born 1900)
10 December – Hans Næss, sailor and Olympic gold medallist (born 1886)

Full date unknown
Torgeir Anderssen-Rysst, politician and Minister (born 1888)
Per Bakken, Nordic skier (born 1882)
Theodor Bull, businessperson and genealogist (born 1870)

See also

References

External links